Arda Anarat (born 2 April 1999) is a Turkish actor.

Life and career 
Anarat was born in Istanbul and is originally from Bafra, Samsun. He started living in central Turkey for his acting career including returning to Istanbul. Anarat graduated from Notre Dame De Sion French High School and started his acting career in the TV series Muhteşem Yüzyıl with the role of Şehzade Mehmet. Arda Anarat, who starred in the famous TV-series Diriliş: Ertuğrul for two seasons, played the role of Umut in Tek Yürek, Efe in Çukur, and Berk in Bilmemek which came to the screens in 2019. He currently portrays Çınar Kaya in Turkish drama series Yargı alongside Pınar Deniz and Kaan Urgancıoğlu.

Filmography

References

External links 
 
 

1999 births
Living people
Turkish male television actors
21st-century Turkish male actors
Male actors from Istanbul
Turkish male child actors